Ambrym is a volcanic island in Malampa Province in the archipelago of Vanuatu.  Volcanic activity on the island includes lava lakes in two craters near the summit.

Etymology
Ambrym (also known as Ambrin, "ham rim" in the Ranon language) was allegedly named by Captain Cook, who is said to have anchored off there in 1774. In fact, his expedition never touched Ambrym.

Geography
With  of surface area, it is the fifth largest island in the country. With the exception of human settlements, the rest of the island is covered by a dense jungle.

Important Bird Area
The western part of the island, comprising 17,605 ha of forest, together with gardens around habitation, has been recognised as an Important Bird Area (IBA) by BirdLife International because it supports populations of Vanuatu megapodes, Tanna fruit doves, red-bellied fruit doves, grey-eared honeyeaters, cardinal myzomelas, fan-tailed gerygones, long-tailed trillers, streaked fantails, Melanesian flycatchers, buff-bellied monarchs and Vanuatu white-eyes.

Volcanology

Ambrym is a large basaltic volcano with a 12-km-wide caldera, and is one of the most active volcanoes of the New Hebrides volcanic arc. The caldera is the result of a huge Plinian eruption, which took place around AD 50. Its explosive force is rated 6, the third highest in the Smithsonian Institution's Volcanic Explosivity Index ranks of the largest volcanic explosions in recent geological history.

These were produced by phreatic eruptions when magma contacted the water table and water-saturated sediments along the coast. The massive, 1900-year-old,  ×  caldera is the site of two active volcanic cones, Benbow and Marum (also spelled Maroum). Mount Benbow was named after English Admiral John Benbow (1653–1702) by Captain Cook.

Several times a century, Ambrym volcano has destructive eruptions. Mount Benbow last erupted explosively in 1913, destroying the mission hospital at Dip Point. Volcanic gas emissions from this volcano are measured by a Multi-Component Gas Analyzer System, which detects pre-eruptive degassing of rising magmas, improving prediction of volcanic activity.

In March 2017, Google added Marum crater with its lava lakes to Google Streetview. Since the last fissure eruption on 16 Dec 2018, the lava lake has disappeared.

Demographics
With the neighbouring island of Malakula and a few smaller islands, Ambrym forms Malampa Province. The population of 7,275 inhabitants  lives mainly off coconut plantations in the three corners of the island.

Languages
Like many islands in Vanuatu, Ambrym has its own Austronesian languages.

In the north:

 Fanbyak
 North Ambrym language

In the southeast:

 Vatlongos

In the southwest:

 Daakie
 Daakaka
 Dalkalaen
 Lonwolwol
 Raljago

Towns and villages

Southwest
 Fali, Craig Cove, Baiap, Sesivi, Port Vato, Bwele, Lalinda, Tow, Yaotilie, Sanesup, Emiotungan, Maranata and Pelibetakever

Southeast
 Maat, Paamal, Toak, Uléi, Utas, Tavéak, Asé, Pawé, Saméo, Endu, Pahakol and Benebo

North
 Ranuetlam,  Ranon, Olal, Fanla, Linboul, Wilit, Lonwara, Fona, Nebul and Megham

Tourism
Tourists are attracted by Ambrym's active volcanoes, tropical vegetation, and the customs of the local villagers. They stay in traditional bungalows, as there are no hotels on the island.

Transportation
The island is served by two airports, Ulei Airport in the southeast and Craig Cove Airport in the southwest.

Popular culture
Ambrym is featured in the 2016 Werner Herzog documentary, Into the Inferno.

References

External links

 
 
 
 

Islands of Vanuatu
Malampa Province
Shield volcanoes of Vanuatu
Mountains of Vanuatu
Subduction volcanoes
Active volcanoes
VEI-6 volcanoes
Calderas of Oceania
Pyroclastic shields
Lava lakes
Important Bird Areas of Vanuatu